Allan Rosencwaig (born Poland, c.1942) is an American physicist.

He worked at Bell Laboratories on photoacoustics, the study of the sound echoes created by light waves, for 7 years before leaving  to join the Lawrence Livermore Laboratory in California.

In 1982 he founded the company of Therma-Wave Inc, and was awarded the status of Fellow of the American Physical Society in 1983, after being nominated by their Division of Condensed Matter Physics, for pioneering work in the development of photoacoustics for solid-state spectroscopy and in the development of thermal-wave physics.

References 

Fellows of the American Physical Society
American Physical Society
American physicists